Visitors to Bahrain must obtain a visa in advance unless they come from one of the visa exempt countries or countries eligible for visa on arrival. Passport must be valid for 6 months from arrival and visitors must hold return or onward ticket.

Visa policy map

Reform
In October 2014, Bahrain implemented a new visa policy that makes it easier for incoming travelers to get Bahraini visas. Travelers must have a passport that is valid for at least six months and a visa to enter Bahrain. However, travelers from approved countries can now get their visas online or when they arrive in the country. Bahrain has issued more visas since the policy was implemented than it did before. Starting in April 2015, Bahrain began sending applicants confirmations of their application status by text messaging.

In November 2016, Bahrain adopted new visa policy rules defining a two-week allowed stay on a single entry visa and a 90-day stay on a multiple entry visa valid for one year. In addition, a multiple entry visa valid for three months allows stay for one month. Citizens of Canada, Ireland, United Kingdom may obtain a five-year multiple entry visa allowing a 90-day stay on each visit.

In October 2020, the United States and Bahrain introduced a reciprocal agreement for a 10-year multi-entry visa scheme for citizens of both countries which also unifies the processing fees and validity of the visa at 90-days per visit for a cost of $160 (60 Bahraini Dinars).

Visa exemption 
Citizens of the following GCC countries do not require a visa to visit Bahrain and may use National ID Cards to enter the country:

Visa exemption also applies to holders of diplomatic and special passports of China, India, and Israel.
 Visa exemption agreements were signed with Hungary and Indonesia, but they are not yet in force.

Visa on arrival or eVisa
Citizens of the following 67(+1) countries and territories may obtain a visa on arrival or online for stays up to one month (three months for the UK and Irish citizens):

Visas must be used within 30 days of approval. Multiple entry visas are valid for 3 months from the time of entry. On each entry a maximum length of stay allowed is one month, extendable for two additional weeks.

Residents of Gulf Cooperation Council countries, who have already stayed for more than six months in their country of residence and their job professions are in approved list, may apply for a 72-hour visa or a seven-day visa upon their arrival at the airport.

Holders of diplomatic, official or service passports can obtain a visa on arrival.

Electronic visa
Citizens of all countries (except North Korea) may obtain an eVisa valid for 14 days.

Applicants must supply scanned copies of air ticket, passport, hotel booking and stamped bank statements covering last 3 months. Electronic visas are valid for 30 days from the date of approval. Applications are processed in approximately 3 to 5 working days.

Citizens of other countries must have a guarantor (Bahraini commercial entity or a Bahraini individual) to obtain a visa.

COVID-19 pandemic
During the COVID-19 pandemic, entry was not allowed for all persons, except nationals of Bahrain, Kuwait, Oman, Qatar, Saudi Arabia and the UAE, who had not previously visited the Schengen Area, China, Iran, Iraq, South Korea, United Kingdom and the United States.

See also

Visa requirements for Bahraini citizens

References

External links
Bahrain Electronic Visa Service

Bahrain
Foreign relations of Bahrain